Pavel Pavlyuchenko or Pavel Pawlyuchenka (born 1 January 1998) is a Belarusian professional footballer who plays as a goalkeeper for Polish club Górnik Zabrze, on loan from Bruk-Bet Termalica Nieciecza, and the Belarus national team.

Honours
Dinamo Brest
Belarusian Premier League champion: 2019
Belarusian Cup winner: 2017–18
Belarusian Super Cup winner: 2018, 2019, 2020

References

External links 
 
 

1998 births
Living people
People from Mogilev
Sportspeople from Mogilev Region
Belarusian footballers
Belarus international footballers
Belarus youth international footballers
Belarus under-21 international footballers
Association football goalkeepers
FC Dnepr Mogilev players
FC Dynamo Brest players
FC Rukh Brest players
Bruk-Bet Termalica Nieciecza players
Górnik Zabrze players
Ekstraklasa players
I liga players
Belarusian expatriate footballers
Expatriate footballers in Poland
Belarusian expatriate sportspeople in Poland